Chuanhui District is a district of the city of Zhoukou in Henan province, China. It lies at the intersection of the Ying River, Sha River and Jialu River. The name "Chuanhui" means that three rivers come across. From the 17th to 19th centuries, it was an important port in China's Inland Waterway System, connecting the Huai River and the Yellow River. The Zhoukou City Government offices are located in Chuanhui District.

Administrative divisions
As 2012, this district is divided to 9 subdistricts and 1 township.
Subdistricts

Townships
Libukou Township

Gallery

References

County-level divisions of Henan
Zhoukou